Michael Edward Woodin (6 November 1965 – 9 July 2004) was the Principal Speaker of the Green Party of England and Wales and a city councillor for Oxford from 1994 to 2004. He was Principal Speaker for six of the eight years between 1998 and 2004, firstly alongside Jean Lambert before her election as an MEP, then alongside Margaret Wright, and lastly with Caroline Lucas MEP.

He was educated at Gravesend Grammar School, Victoria University of Manchester, and Wolfson College, Oxford. He was lecturer in Psychology at Balliol College.

Biography 

Woodin was one of the first Green Party city councillors elected in England and was Leader of the Green Party Group on Oxford City Council. He stood for the Green party in Oxford West and Abingdon in the 1992, 1997, and 2001 general elections. He was listed as Green Party's second candidate in South East England for the European Parliament elections in 1999 and 2004 after Caroline Lucas.

Woodin and Lucas co-authored the book Green Alternatives to Globalisation: A Manifesto, and a booklet against the single currency Euro: The Euro or a Sustainable Future for Britain?.

Woodin died in 2004 of secondary cancer of the lungs, despite being a lifelong non-smoker and keen observant of healthy living. At his funeral, his coffin was towed by bicycle through the streets of Oxford, in accordance with his wishes for the event to be car-free. His early death was considered a tragedy for the resurgent Green movement in the United Kingdom.

References

External links

1965 births
2004 deaths
Burials in Oxfordshire
Alumni of Wolfson College, Oxford
Deaths from lung cancer in England
English Jews
Green Party of England and Wales parliamentary candidates
Members of Oxford City Council
People educated at Gravesend Grammar School